Tân Phong may refer to several commune-level subdivisions in Vietnam, including:

Tân Phong, District 7, a ward of District 7, Ho Chi Minh City
Tân Phong, Biên Hòa, a ward of Biên Hòa
Tân Phong, Lai Châu, a ward of Lai Châu
Tân Phong, Thanh Hóa, a township and capital of Quảng Xương District
Tân Phong, Haiphong, a commune of Kiến Thụy District
Tân Phong, Bạc Liêu, a commune of Giá Rai
Tân Phong, Bến Tre, a commune of Thạnh Phú District
Tân Phong, Hải Dương, a commune of Ninh Giang District
Tân Phong, Sơn La, a commune of Phù Yên District
Tân Phong, Tây Ninh, a commune of Tân Biên District
Tân Phong, Thái Bình, a commune of Vũ Thư District
Tân Phong, Tiền Giang, a commune of Cai Lậy District
Tân Phong, Vĩnh Phúc, a commune of Bình Xuyên District